Cuxton is a village in the unitary authority of Medway in South East England. It lies on the left bank of the River Medway in the North Downs. It is served by the A228, and Cuxton railway station on the Medway Valley Line between Strood and Maidstone. A low valley leads up from the river to the hamlet of Lower Bush.

History

Archaeological evidence suggest the first human occupation was around 200,000 years ago. A hoard of 196 handaxes from the Acheulian era was excavated in 1962. This is now displayed in the British Museum. The name is believed to have developed from "Cucula's stone".

The remains of a Roman villa were found under the church yard. The Saxons occupied the town and it became known as Cuckelstane. The church and parish was given by Æthelwulf, King of the West Saxons to the Cathedral church of St. Andrew, Rochester. The church contains much Norman architecture, and is unusual as it lies on a southeast–northwest axis. This gave rise to the rhyme, He that would see a church miswent / Let him go to Cucklestane in Kent.

In Tudor times the principal house in the town was Whorne's Place, erected on the river by Sir William Whorne, Lord Mayor of London in 1487. This was later owned by the Leveson family and most notably Sir John Leveson who was Lord Deputy Lieutenant of Kent. This was taken over by the Mashams, strong royalists who moved on to the Mote in Maidstone. The mansion was demolished in 1782 and only an outlying granary, now a house still bearing the name Whorne's Place, survives in 2011.

The only other manor in Tudor Cuxton was that of Beresse or Beresh, now known as Bush. It doesn't survive.

In 1610, William Laud was rector of Cuxton; he later became Archbishop of Canterbury under Charles I and was executed by the puritans in 1645 because of his strong royalist loyalties.

In Upper Bush there are four houses dating from 14th century and a Tudor Kentish Yeoman's house. A tin chapel from Cuxton was dismantled and re-erected at the Museum of Kent Life, Sandling.

On 10 August 2015, a gang smuggling guns into the UK were filmed by officers from the National Crime Agency (NCA) as they unloaded their illicit cargo near Cuxton Marina. The gang were intercepted as they made their way to a second site, where they planned to bury the weapons; two of the gang were subsequently found guilty of gun smuggling. The NCA described the haul of weapons and ammunition seized by its officers as the largest of its kind in the UK.

Ranscombe Farm

Ranscombe Farm is a plantlife nature reserve, country park and working farm. Part of the site is included in the Cobham Woods Site of Special Scientific Interest, and the whole farm is within the Kent Downs Area of Outstanding Natural Beauty.

Governance
Cuxton is part of the electoral ward called Cuxton and Halling. The population of this ward at the 2011 census was 5,448.

Industry
Chalk extraction and Cement.

References

External links

Places in Medway